HMCS Galt was a  of the Royal Canadian Navy that served during the Second World War. She saw action primarily in the Battle of the Atlantic. She was named after the city of Galt, Ontario.

Background

Flower-class corvettes like Galt serving with the Royal Canadian Navy during the Second World War were different from earlier and more traditional sail-driven corvettes.  The "corvette" designation was created by the French as a class of small warships; the Royal Navy borrowed the term for a period but discontinued its use in 1877. During the hurried preparations for war in the late 1930s, Winston Churchill reactivated the corvette class, needing a name for smaller ships used in an escort capacity, in this case based on a whaling ship design. The generic name "flower" was used to designate the class of these ships, which – in the Royal Navy – were named after flowering plants.

Corvettes commissioned by the Royal Canadian Navy during the Second World War were named after communities for the most part, to better represent the people who took part in building them. This idea was put forth by Admiral Percy W. Nelles. Sponsors were commonly associated with the community for which the ship was named. Royal Navy corvettes were designed as open sea escorts, while Canadian corvettes were developed for coastal auxiliary roles which was exemplified by their minesweeping gear. Eventually the Canadian corvettes would be modified to allow them to perform better on the open seas.

Construction
She was ordered 1 February 1940 as part of the 1939-1940 Flower-class building program. She was laid down by Collingwood Shipyards at Collingwood, Ontario on 27 May 1940 and was launched on 28 December 1940. Galt was commissioned on 15 May 1941 at Montreal, Quebec.

During her career, Galt had three major refits. The first began in February 1942 at Liverpool, Nova Scotia and took until May of that year to complete. Her second began January 1943, this time begun at Liverpool, but completed at Halifax in mid-April 1943. Her final refit, begun in March 1944 at New York saw Galts fo'c'sle extended. This took until May 1944 to complete.

War duty
Galt was initially assigned to the Newfoundland Escort Force after workups. Galt escorted six trans-Atlantic convoys without loss before being assigned to Mid-Ocean Escort Force (MOEF) group C3 in June 1942. With group C3, she participated in the battles for convoy ON 115 and convoy SC 109. After a yard overhaul in early 1943, Galt escorted 12 trans-Atlantic convoys without loss before another yard overhaul in January 1944. During that time, she was assigned mainly to MOEF group C1.  After that refit, Galt escorted North American coastal convoys with the Western Local Escort Force from July 1944 until May 1945 as part of group W-5.

Trans-Atlantic convoys escorted

Post war service
Galt was paid off following the end of hostilities on 21 June 1945 at Sorel, Quebec. The ship was sold on 5 October 1945 and was scrapped in 1946 at Hamilton.

References

Flower-class corvettes of the Royal Canadian Navy
1940 ships